Yingyong Yodbuangam born December 25, 1962, in Khukhan District, Sisaket Province, Thailand) is a famous Thai Luk thung singer. He was popularized by the song "Somsri 1992".

Early life
His birth name is Prayong Buangam and he was born on 25 December 1962, in Khukhan District, Sisaket Province. He is the son of Ploy and Nai Buangam. Since his family was very poor during his young life, he had to work while attending primary classes to help his parents out. After finishing primary 6, he became a monk.

Next, from pay of temple he became a monk, he was educated until he finished education in secondary 3 from Ku Khan Rat Banrung School. He then left the Buddhist monkhood and went to work in Bangkok where he met with Pamon Anothai, a famous songwriter.

He graduated from University at Dhonburi

Career and first popularlity
He went to help Pamon in a Radio Station job of Territorial Defense Command. After working for 2 years, Pamon took songs to him to record including "Ai Num Lieang Kwai" and "Rak Rak Rak". After the recording, Pamon decided a stage name for him, Yingyong Yodbuangam. When his songs started to be popular, Wanchana Kieddee asked him to sing in a café act as Wanchana so busy.

Next, Sakhon Atanawichai listened to his song, liked his sound, and recorded a studio album, "Ai Num Lieng Kwai", together with established Luk thung band for him. After that, he recorded and released many studio albums including "Wi Man Rak", "Ai Num Chao Ruea". In 1992, with his studio album, "Ying Yong Ma Laew", he had the most famous and popular song of his life, "Som Sri 1992", composed by Wut Worakand. Then Wut took the song title "Som Sri 1992" in side B of compact cassette, because he did not know that in future this song would be so popular.

At present he is a singer for record label Topline Diamond.

Family life
He was married to Yodsana Phumarae; they have two children. and Putthikrai Buangam. He then married Mobthathip Buangam and had a daughter.

Partial discography
 Som Sri 1992 (สมศรี 1992)
 Ying Yong Ma Laew (ยิ่งยงมาแล้ว)
 Ai Num Lieng Kwai (ไอ้หนุ่มเลี้ยงควาย)
 Chang Thong Rong Hai (ช่างทองร้องไห้)
 Aok Hak Pro Rak Miea (อกหักเพราะรักเมีย)
 Pood Hai Roo Rueng Bang (พูดให้รู้เรื่องบ้าง)
 Num Surin Rak Sao Surat (หนุ่มสุรินทร์รักสาวสุราษฎร์)
 Pom Took Prak Pram (ผมถูกปรักปรำ)
 Kin Ya Pid Song (กินยาผิดซอง)
 Khoe Nguen Miea Pai Sia Kha Hong (ขอเงินเมียไปเสียค่าห้อง) 
 Kan Truem Ska (กันตรึมสกา)
 Koei Nong Yeam Thee Bor Kor Sor (คอยน้องแย้​มที่ บ.ข.​ส​)

MC 
 Online 
 2018 : – On Air YouTube:Yingyong 24

References

1962 births
Living people
Yingyong Yodbuangam
Yingyong Yodbuangam
Yingyong Yodbuangam
Yingyong Yodbuangam
Yingyong Yodbuangam
Yingyong Yodbuangam
Yingyong Yodbuangam
Yingyong Yodbuangam
Yingyong Yodbuangam
Yingyong Yodbuangam
Yingyong Yodbuangam
Yingyong Yodbuangam
Yingyong Yodbuangam
Yingyong Yodbuangam